Dilophotriche is a genus of West African plants in the grass family.

 Species
 Dilophotriche occidentalis Jacq.-Fél.  - Guinea
 Dilophotriche pobeguinii Jacq.-Fél. - Guinea, Guinea-Bissau, Senegal, Burkina Faso
 Dilophotriche tristachyoides (Trin.) Jacq.-Fél. - Guinea, Guinea-Bissau, Senegal, Mali, Sierra Leone

References

External links
 Grassbase - The World Online Grass Flora: Dilophotriche

Poaceae genera
Grasses of Africa
Flora of West Tropical Africa
Taxa named by Charles Edward Hubbard
Panicoideae